Shattered Existence is the debut album by the British thrash metal  band Xentrix. it was released on 18 September 1989 through R/C Records.  Shattered Existence would also enter the UK charts. The album itself peaked at #31.

Track listing

Personnel
Chris Astley  - vocals, rhythm guitar
Kristian "Stan" Havard  - lead guitar
Paul "Macka" MacKenzie  - bass
Dennis Gasser  - drums

References

1989 albums
Roadrunner Records albums
Xentrix albums